Daniel Rogers Pinkham Jr. (June 5, 1923 – December 18, 2006) was an American composer, organist, and harpsichordist.

Early life and education
Born in Lynn, Massachusetts, into a prominent family engaged in the manufacture of patent medicines (his great-grandmother was Lydia E. Pinkham), he studied organ performance and music theory at Phillips Academy with Carl F. Pfatteicher. "The single event that changed my life was a concert [at Andover] by the Trapp Family Singers in 1939, right after they had escaped from Germany," Pinkham once recalled. "Here, suddenly, I was hearing clarity, simplicity. It shaped my whole outlook," he said in a 1981 interview with The Boston Globe.

At Harvard University, he studied with Walter Piston; Aaron Copland, Archibald T. Davison, and A. Tillman Merritt were also among his teachers. There he completed a bachelor's degree in 1942 and a master's in 1944. He also studied harpsichord with Putnam Aldrich and Wanda Landowska, and organ with E. Power Biggs. At Tanglewood, he studied composition with Samuel Barber and Arthur Honegger, and subsequently with Nadia Boulanger.

Career 
Pinkham taught at the Boston Conservatory beginning in 1946, and at the New England Conservatory of Music from 1959 until his death in 2006; while there, he created and chaired the program on early music performance. In 1951, Pinkham conducted ten works by Boulanger Award winners in their Boston performance première in a special Peabody Mason Concert series commemorating the Paris Bi-Millennial year. He also taught at various times at Simmons University (1953–1954), Boston University (1953–1954), and Harvard University (1957–1958). Among Pinkham's notable students were the jazz musician and composer Gigi Gryce (1925–1983) and the composer Mark DeVoto.

For forty-two years (1958–2000), Pinkham was the organist of King's Chapel in Boston, a position which gave him much exposure to and opportunity to write church-related music; the Sunday evening concert series he created there celebrated its 50th anniversary in 2007. He was also a frequent guest on the E. Power Biggs program on the CBS Radio Network. He performed regularly with the Boston Symphony Orchestra as an organist and as a harpsichordist, and he performed extensively with noted violinist Robert Brink, with whom he commissioned a duo for violin and harpsichord from Alan Hovhaness.

Compositions 
Pinkham's output represents a broad cross-section of 20th-century musical trends. He produced work in virtually every genre, from symphonies to art songs, though the preponderance of his music is religious in nature, frequently choral and/or involving organ. Much of his music was written for use in church services or other ceremonial occasions, and reflected his longstanding relationship with King's Chapel. At various points in his career, he embraced plainchant, medievally-influenced modal writing, and 17th-century forms (in the 1930s and 40s, under the influence of Stravinsky and Hindemith and reflecting his commitment to the early music revival), dodecaphony and serialism (in the 1950s and 60s), electronic music (beginning in 1970), and the neo-baroque idiom.

Some of Pinkham's best-known works are designed for services: the Christmas, Advent, and Wedding cantatas, the latter of which is performed particularly often. In 2003, he gained further notice with his commissioned piece, written for the Boston Landmarks Orchestra, of Make Way for Ducklings. In keeping with the name of the ensemble, the work was designed to be performed for families at the Boston Public Garden, near the famous sculptures based on Robert McCloskey's endearing picture book.

Pinkham's scholarship and work were recognized with a Fulbright Fellowship in 1950 and a Ford Foundation Fellowship in 1962. He received honorary degrees from the New England Conservatory of Music as well as from Nebraska Wesleyan University, Adrian College, Westminster Choir College, Ithaca College, and the Boston Conservatory.

In 1971, he wrote The Other Voices of the Trumpet for trumpet, organ, and tape, for the inaugural International Contemporary Organ Music Festival at the Hartt School of Music. In 1982, he returned to the Hartt festival to give a lecture about his own harpsichord music. In 1990, Pinkham was named Composer of the Year by the American Guild of Organists. In 1995, he was awarded the Brock Commission from the American Choral Directors Association. In 2006 Pinkham was named Musician of the Year by the Boston Musicians' Association, AFM Local 9-535.

Personal life 
Pinkham died in Natick, Massachusetts, of chronic lymphocytic leukemia, at the age of 83. He is survived by his longtime partner, the organist Andrew Paul Holman.

References

External links 
Daniel Pinkham official site (archive from 17 October 2017, accessed 7 August 2018
The Boston Globe obit
Interview with Daniel Pinkham, April 4, 1987

1923 births
2006 deaths
20th-century American composers
20th-century classical composers
21st-century American composers
21st-century classical composers
American classical organists
American contemporary classical composers
American male classical composers
American male organists
American classical composers
American harpsichordists
Composers for carillon
Contemporary classical music performers
Culture of Boston
Deaths from cancer in Massachusetts
Deaths from leukemia
Harvard University alumni
LGBT classical composers
American LGBT musicians
LGBT people from Massachusetts
People from Lynn, Massachusetts
Pupils of Aaron Copland
Pupils of Arthur Honegger
Pupils of Walter Piston
20th-century American male musicians
Male classical organists